Lyonbrotherz is a German DJ and producer duo formed of cousins Daniel Lyon (born Daniel Rolletschek) and Keven Lyon (born Keven Brüffer). Daniel was born in Ahaus, Germany, on 15 July 1990 and Keven was born in Gronau, Germany, on 19 December 1990. Best known for producing EDM and Hip-hop as well as DJing, the cousins are part of the music production team of I-35 Music and founded the two record labels I-35 Music and League of Lyons.

Career 
Starting out at the age of 16, Daniel and Keven began as the duo wanted to stay out of trouble and work towards solving their problems. They first wrote rap and Hip-hop lyrics, learning about beats and going on to produce their own as well as national and international artists.
Developing their own music skills, Daniel visited one of the biggest electronic music festivals in Germany and encouraged Keven to begin a new chapter in their careers focussed on Electronic dance music (EDM). This was the beginning of Lyonbrotherz.

In early 2016 they founded their own record label named League of Lyons for EDM releases and the sub label I-35 Music for hip hop productions. In May they DJ-ed on the main stage of Springbreak Europe  and in July they produced the soundtrack for an advertising campaign of an international fashion Brand.
In 2017 the newcomer DJ and producer Greenskiez signed a contract with their record label League of Lyons.

Public Image 
Lyonbrotherz support up-and-coming musicians. They are looking to found their own charity to support the deaf, giving them a chance to hear through implants.

Discography

Singles

Remixes

References

External links 

 
 Lyonbrotherz on Discogs

German DJs
German record producers
Electro house musicians
German musical duos
Electronic dance music DJs